Elections for the Indian state of Jammu and Kashmir were held in February 1967. Ghulam Mohammed Sadiq was appointed Chief Minister of Jammu and Kashmir.

Background
In 1965, the working committee of the Jammu & Kashmir National Conference announced that it would dissolve itself and merge with the Indian National Congress. A rival faction led by Bakshi Ghulam Mohammad refused to go along and contested the elections under the National Conference banner.

Prior to that, in 1963, the Jammu Praja Parishad also merged into the national party Bharatiya Jana Sangh.
These mergers are seen by analysts as a major "centralizing strategy" and a victory for the Hindu nationalist agenda of the Praja Parishad and its allies.

There were reports that Bakshi was planning to forge an electoral alliance with the Jana Sangh, despite their differences on the Article 370, but the alliance did not materialize. The Jana Sangh, whose main base was in the Jammu Division, planned to contest in the Kashmir Valley taking advantage of the rivalry between the Congress and the National Conference.

The election
Of the 75 seats, 42 seats were allocated to the Kashmir Valley, 31 to Jammu, and 2 to Ladakh.

The National Conference contested 73 seats overall. The Jana Sangh contested all 31 seats of Jammu and several seats in the Valley. The Plebiscite Front officially boycotted the election, but several members contested as independent candidates, including the General Secretary Ali Mohammad Naik, who contested from Tral, and Ghulam Mohammed Bhat, contesting from Habbakadal in Srinagar. The Awami Action Committee also boycotted the election. Other parties that contested included the rump group of the National Conference under the leadership of Bakshi Ghulam Mohammad, the rump group of the Democratic National Conference under the leadership of Ram Piara Saraf, and the national parties Communist Party of India, Praja Socialist Party and the Hindu Mahasabha.

The nomination papers of 118 candidates were rejected on technical grounds, 55 of them because the candidates had failed to take the obligatory oath of allegiance to the Constitution. As a result, 22 seats in the Valley were unopposed, resulting in a win for the Congress candidates.

Simultaneously, elections were also held for the Lok Sabha (the Lower House of the Indian Parliament) in the 6 Lok Sabha constituencies of the State.

Results
The Indian National Congress won 61 seats in the state assembly, emerging as the winning party. Bakshi's National Conference won 8 seats and the Jana Sangh 3 seats. Three other seats were won by independent candidates, one of them by Ali Mohammed Naik of the Plebiscite Front.

In the elections for the Lok Sabha, 5 of the 6 seats were won by the Congress, of which 2 were unopposed. The remaining seat was won by Bakshi Ghulam Mohammad of the National Conference, contesting from Srinagar. Scholar Sumantra Bose remarks that Bakshi might never have won a free election "at any point during his ten years in office", but he did so now holding the banner of Kashmiri regionalist resistance to New Delhi.

Elected members

Government formation
On 17 March, a 14-member ministry headed by G. M. Sadiq was sworn in. The Cabinet ministers included Girdhari Lal Dogra, D. P. Dhar, Mohammed Ayub Khan, Peer Giasuddin and Kanwar Ranjit Singh.  Abdul Gani Lone was among the Ministers of State, and Mufti Mohammed Sayeed was among the Deputy Ministers.

References

Bibliography
 
 

Jammu and Kashmir
1967
1967